Robert Harydance (by 1464–1514), of Norwich, Norfolk, was an English politician.

He was a Member of Parliament for Norwich in 1512.

References

15th-century births
1514 deaths
Politicians from Norwich
English MPs 1512–1514